Roger Lee Welsch (November 6, 1936 – September 30, 2022) was an American news reporter who was a senior correspondent on the CBS News Sunday Morning program, and was featured in a segment called "Postcards from Nebraska." An author, humorist and folklorist, Welsch was born in Lincoln, Nebraska, the only son of Christian Welsch, who worked in a Goodyear tire factory and Bertha (Flach) Welsch, a homemaker. He lived outside of Dannebrog, Nebraska.

Welsch earned a bachelor's degree in 1958 and a master's degree in 1960, both in German and both at the University of Nebraska. He also studied folklore at the University of Colorado and Indiana University.

Welsch was the 2005 winner of the Henry Fonda Award from the State of Nebraska Travel and Tourism Division. 

Welsch died on September 30, 2022, at the age of 85, after entering hospice for kidney failure.

Bibliography
 Why I'm an Only Child and Other Slightly Naughty Plains Folktales. Nebraska Press, 2016.
 The Reluctant Pilgrim: A Skeptic’s Journey into Native Mysteries. Nebraska, 2015.
 My Nebraska: The Good, the Bad, and the Husker. Nebraska, 2011.
 Weed 'em and Reap. Falcon, 2006. 
 From Tinkering to Torquing: A Beginner's Guide to Tractors and Tools. MBI Publishing Company, 2005. 
 A Life with Dogs. Motorbooks International, 2004.
 Everything I Know About Women, I Learned From My Tractor, MBI Publishing Company, 2002, 2003
 Old Tractors Never Die: Roger's Guide to the Care and Feeding of Ancient Iron. Voyageur Press, 2001. 
 Postcards from Nebraska: The Stories Behind the Stories as Seen on CBS News "Sunday Morning." J&L Lee Company, 2000. 
 Love, Sex, and Tractors. Motorbooks International, 2000. 
 Diggin' in and Piggin' Out: The Truth About Food and Men. New York: HarperCollins, 1997.  
 Busted Tractors and Rusty Knuckles: Norwegian Torque Wrench Techniques and Other Fine Points of Tractor Restoration. Motorbooks International, 1997. 
 Old Tractors and the Men Who Love Them: How to Keep Your Tractors Happy and Your Family Running. Motorbooks International, 1995. 
 Uncle Smoke Stories: Four Fires in the Big Belly Lodge of the Nehawka. New York: Knopf, 1994.
 Touching the Fire: Buffalo Dancers, the Sky Bundle, and Other Tales. New York: Fawcett, 1993. 
 Liar's Too: Liar's Corner — The Saga Continues: Another Two and a Half Years of Laughter from the Nebraska Farmer's Liar's Corner. Lincoln: J&L Lee Company, 1993. 
 You Know You're a Nebraskan. Lincoln: J&L Lee Company, 1991.  
 Sod Walls. Lincoln: J&L Lee Company, 1991. 
 It's Not the End of the World But You Can See It From Here. New York: Ballantine, 1990. 
 Mister, You Got Yourself a Horse: Tales of Old-Time Horse Trading. Lincoln: University of Nebraska Press, 1987. 
 Shingling the Fog and Other Plains Lies. Lincoln: University of Nebraska Press, 1986. 
 Catfish at the Pump: Humor and the Frontier. with Linda K. Welsch. Lincoln: U of Nebraska P, 1986. 
 A Treasury of Nebraska Pioneer Folklore. Lincoln: University of Nebraska Press, 1984.
 Cather's Kitchens: Foodways in Literature and Life. With Linda K. Welsch. Lincoln: University of Nebraska Press, 1983.
 Omaha Tribal Myths and Tricksters Tales. Swallow Press, 1981.  
 Tall-Tale Postcards: A Pictorial History. Oak Tree Publications, 1976.
 A Treasury of Nebraska Pioneer Folklore. Nebraska Press, 1966.

Articles 
Welsch has been published in a variety of publications, including Esquire, Natural History, Successful Farming, and elsewhere.

Recordings 
 The Prairie: Pistol to Plow. Lincoln, NE: Media Productions, 1986. 
 Omaha Indian Music. (liner notes) American Folklife Center, 1985. 
 Sweet Nebraska Land. Folkways Records, 1965.

Awards 
 "Henry Fonda Award", Nebraska Travel and Tourism Division, 2005.
 "Man of the Year In Service to Nebraska Agriculture", 1996.
 "Mari Sandoz Award" from the Nebraska Library Association.
 "President's Award for creative young faculty", Nebraska Wesleyan University, 1967.

References

External links 
 "Roger Welsch," CBS.
 "Roger Welsch," Nebraska Center for Writers.
 Sweet Nebraska Land Album Details at Smithsonian Folkways

1936 births
2022 deaths
American folklorists
American humorists
American non-fiction writers
American reporters and correspondents
Entertainers from Nebraska
Writers from Lincoln, Nebraska